
Cruwys Morchard  is an ecclesiastical and civil parish in the Mid Devon district of the county of Devon in England. It is located about four to five miles west of Tiverton along the road to Witheridge. The church and the manor house are in the centre of the parish. The population at the time of the 2000 census was 461. The parish takes its name from the Cruwys family who have been Lords of the Manor here since the reign of King John (1199–1216).

History 

The name Morchard means the great wood or forest from the Celtic: mǭr cę̃d, Modern Welsh: mawr coed. The manorial affix is from the de Crues family who held the manor here in the 13th century.  
The manor of Morceth is mentioned twice in the Domesday book of 1086, with part being held in-chief by William Cheever, the 35th of his 46 Devonshire holdings, and part being held in-chief by Geoffrey de Montbray, Bishop of Coutances, the 73rd of his 99 Devonshire holdings. William Cheever's lands later formed the feudal barony of Bradninch from which Cruwys Morchard was later held by the Cruwys family.

Church of Holy Cross
It is believed that a wooden church existed in Cruwys Morchard from the time of Godfrey de Sowy, who was the first rector in 1262.
The Church of the Holy Cross was built in 1529 with a spire on top of the church tower. This, however, was struck by lightning in 1689, and the consequent major fire, which melted the bells, necessitated the rebuilding of the top stage of the tower in brick. It also destroyed painted windows which bore the arms of the Cruwys family. The repairs, which also involved a new roof and new pews, took thirteen years to complete. The windows were replaced with stained glass renderings of the Cruwys arms.

There was also a chapel belonging to Cruwys Morchard House which was the burial place of the Cruwys family, but the chapel was destroyed by Oliver Cromwell, and it is believed that many family monuments were destroyed at the same time.

People

 Robert Cruwys (1884–1951), cricketer and clergyman
 Margaret Campbell Speke Cruwys (1894–1968), Devon historian.
 Sir Robert Cruwys (d 1362) was knighted for his service in France in the Hundred Years War; he probably fought at the Battle of Crecy on 26 August 1346 and the Battle of Poitiers on 19 September 1356
 Robertus de Cruwes was a Member of Parliament for Devon in 1340 and 1344
 Hugh Peters (1598–1660), the preacher and regicide, spent much of his childhood at Cruwys Morchard House with his uncle and aunt Lewis Cruwys and Sarah Cruwys née Treffry.
 Cruwys Morchard is the alias of Clytie Potts, a fictional character in the 2006 novel A Darkling Plain, written by Devon resident Philip Reeve.

References

External links 

 Genuki page
 Cruwys Morchard parish page
 Cruwys one-name study
 Photograph and story of the Church
 Old postcards of Cruwys Morchard

Villages in Devon
Former manors in Devon